Niels Scheuneman (born 21 December 1983 in Veendam) is a Dutch former professional road bicycle racer.

Biography
When Scheuneman was still a junior, won a silver and a bronze medal in the junior races of the 2001 UCI Road World Championships. In the 2003 UCI Road World Championships, he competed in the U23 category, and finished second in the time trial.

Scheuneman transferred in 2004 to the Bodysol team, to become a full professional. The Bodysol team then merged with the Relax team, and the combination competed one lever higher, which did not suit Scheuneman, and he had a bad year. At the end of the year, Scheuneman returned to the  team, where he rode as a junior.

In 2005, Scheuneman rode the 2005 Vuelta a España, his only grand tour so far. During a fall which also hurt Roberto Heras, Scheuneman broke his finger and had to abandon the race.

At the end of the 2006 season, Scheuneman's contract with  ended, and he switched to the  team. This team was banned from most races in 2007, so Scheuneman did not race a lot. At the end of the season, he decided to retire from professional racing.

In 2008, he decided to return to racing, and joined the continental KrolStone team.

Major results 

Source:

2000
 2nd Classique des Alpes Juniors
2001
 1st Overall Grand Prix Rüebliland
 1st Overall Keizer der Juniores
 UCI Junior Road World Championships
2nd  Road race
3rd  Time trial
 2nd Overall Tour de l'Abitibi
 2nd Overall Grand Prix Général Patton
 2nd Classique des Alpes Juniors
2002
 1st Stage 2 Triptyque Ardennais
 2nd Time trial, National Under-23 Road Championships
 8th Time trial, UCI Under-23 Road World Championships
2003
 1st Zesbergenprijs Harelbeke
 2nd  Time trial, UCI Under-23 Road World Championships
 2nd Time trial, National Under-23 Road Championships
 2nd Overall Ster Elektrotoer
 3rd Overall Niedersachsen-Rundfahrt
 3rd Overall Triptyque des Monts et Châteaux
 4th Overall Thüringen-Rundfahrt
1st Young rider classification
 4th Overall Triptyque Ardennais
2004
 1st Noord-Nederland Tour (with 21 others)
 9th GP Rudy Dhaenens
2005
 6th Overall Tour de Luxembourg
2006
 3rd LuK Challenge (with Marc Wauters)
2008
 1st Stage 4 Tour du Loir-et-Cher
 10th Overall Olympia's Tour

References

External links

1983 births
Living people
Dutch male cyclists
People from Veendam
UCI Road World Championships cyclists for the Netherlands
Cyclists from Groningen (province)